Allium longicollum is a plant species found in Pakistan and Afghanistan. It is a perennial herb up to 35 cm tall, with a hemispherical umbel of white flowers.

References

longicollum
Onions
Flora of Afghanistan
Flora of Pakistan
Plants described in 1968